The Association of Independent Multiple Pharmacies is a British trade association, based in Doncaster for pharmacies which are privately owned, and their suppliers and contractors.

It is a member of the Community Pharmacy Supervision Practice Group with the Company Chemists’ Association, the National Pharmacy Association, and the Pharmacists' Defence Association.

Leyla Hannbeck is the chief executive. She pointed out that their members had delivered 16 million vaccinations by December 2021 and are identifying unvaccinated people, but said there was too much red tape.

In December 2021 the association protested that during the COVID-19 pandemic in the United Kingdom many pharmacies were “inundated by patients walking in because they were instructed by some GP surgeries to do so”.  They complained about shortages of lateral flow tests.  Hannbeck said that every five minutes, approximately, somebody goes into a pharmacy asking for a test but do not always get them as supply is "patchy".

References 

Pharmacy organisations in the United Kingdom
Organisations based in South Yorkshire